Buckenham is a small village in the English county of Norfolk situated on the northern bank of the River Yare around  south-east of Norwich.

History
Buckenham's name is of Anglo-Saxon origin and derives from the Old English for Bucca's homestead.

In the Domesday Book, Buckenham is recorded as consisting of 195 households with the principal landowners being King William, Bury St Edmunds Abbey and William d'Ecouis.

Places of Interest
The Parish Church, St Nicholas Church, Buckenham, is Grade I listed and currently in the care of the Churches Conservation Trust.

Nearby Buckenham Marshes RSPB reserve is a haven for birdwatching, including taiga bean geese, lapwings and wigeons.

Transport
Buckenham railway station serves the outlying communities and the RSPB reserve. The station is served by Wherry Lines trains from Norwich to Great Yarmouth and Lowestoft.

War Memorial
Buckenham's War Memorial is a stone Cross of Sacrifice located in St. Nicholas' Churchyard. It lists the following names for the First World War:
 Captain Victor W. Harrison (1895-1918), Royal Flying Corps
 Second-Lieutenant Cyril H. Harrison (1897-1917), 10th Battalion, South Lancashire Regiment
 Private Ernest A. Curtis (1893-1918), 19th Battalion, Lancashire Fusiliers
 Private Jonathan Balls (1887-1917), Depot, Manchester Regiment
 Private Herbert H. Curtis (1889-1917), 1st Battalion, Royal Norfolk Regiment

And, the following for the Second World War:
 Able-Seaman Ronald G. Tidman (1910-1942), HMS Palomares

References

External links

Villages in Norfolk
Broadland